Thomas Nelson Parker Jr. (March 15, 1927 – April 26, 2011) was an American politician who served in the Virginia House of Delegates. He was the son of T. Nelson Parker.

References 

1927 births
2011 deaths
Democratic Party members of the Virginia House of Delegates
University of Virginia alumni
University of Virginia School of Law alumni
20th-century American lawyers
20th-century American politicians